

I

I–I'

 I Accuse My Parents (1944)
 I Am: (2010 American documentary, 2010 American drama, 2010 Indian & 2012)
 I Am All Girls (2021)
 I Am an American Soldier (2007)
 I Am Big Bird: The Caroll Spinney Story (2014)
 I Am Cuba (1964)
 I Am Curious (Blue) (1968)
 I Am Curious (Yellow) (1967)
 I Am David (2003)
 I Am Dina (2002)
 I Am a Fugitive from a Chain Gang (1932)
 I Am Greta (2020)
 I Am Heath Ledger (2017)
 I Am a Hero (2016)
 I Am Jonas (2018)
 I Am Josh Polonski's Brother (2001)
 I Am Kalam (2010)
 I Am the Law: (1922, 1938 & 1977)
 I am Legend (2007)
 I Am Love (2009)
 I Am Michael (2015)
 I Am Mother (2019)
 I Am Nezha (2016)
 I Am Not a Hipster (2012)
 I Am Not Lorena (2014)
 I Am Not What You Want (2001)
 I Am Not a Witch (2017)
 I Am Number Four (2011)
 I Am Omega (2007)
 I Am the Pretty Thing That Lives in the House (2016)
 I Am Sam (2001)
 I am Sartana, Your Angel of Death (1969)
 I Am a Sex Addict (2006)
 I Am Still Here (2017)
 I Am Trying to Break Your Heart (2002)
 I Am Vengeance (2018)
 I Am Vengeance: Retaliation (2020)
 I Belonged to You (2016)
 I Bury the Living (1958)
 I Came By (2022)
 I Can Do Bad All by Myself (2009)
 I Can Get It for You Wholesale (1951)
 I Can Hear the Sea (1993)
 I Can't Go Home (2008)
 I Can't Sleep (1994)
 I Capture the Castle (2003)
 I Care a Lot (2020)
 I Carry You with Me (2020)
 I Come in Peace (1990)
 I Confess (1953)
 I Could Go On Singing (1963)
 I Could Never Be Your Woman (2007)
 I Cover the Waterfront (1933)
 I Died a Thousand Times (1955)
 I Do Not Care If We Go Down in History as Barbarians (2018)
 I Do Not Want to Know Who You Are (1932)
 I Don't Feel at Home in This World Anymore (2017)
 I Don't Hear the Guitar Anymore (1991)
 I Don't Know How She Does It (2011)
 I Dood It (1943)
 I Downloaded a Ghost (2004)
 I Dream Too Much: (1935 & 2015)
 I Dreamed of Africa (2000)
 I Drink Your Blood (1971)
 I Eat Your Skin (1971)
 I Even Met Happy Gypsies (1967)
 I Feel Pretty (2018)
 I Fidanzati (1962)
 I Girasoli (1970)
 I Give It a Year (2013)
 I Got the Hook Up (1998)
 I Got Life! (2017)
 I Hate Luv Storys (2010)
 I Hate Valentine's Day (2009)
 I Have Something Important to Tell You (2005)
 I Haven't Got a Hat (1935)
 I Heard the Owl Call My Name (1973 TV)
 I Heart Huckabees (2004)
 I Hired a Contract Killer (1990)
 I Hope They Serve Beer in Hell (2009)
 I as in Icarus (1979)
 The I Inside (2004)
 I Kill Giants (2017)
 I Kill, You Kill (1965)
 I Killed My Lesbian Wife, Hung Her on a Meat Hook, and Now I Have a Three-Picture Deal at Disney (1993)
 I Killed My Mother (2009)
 I Kiss Your Hand, Madame (1929)
 I Knew Her Well (1965)
 I Know What You Did Last Summer (1997)
 I Know Where I'm Going! (1945)
 I Know Who Killed Me (2007)
 I Like You, I Like You Very Much (1994)
 I Live in Fear (1955)
 I Live My Life (1935)
 I Lost My Body (2019)
 I Love Beijing (2000)
 I Love a Man in Uniform (1993)
 I Love to Singa (1936)
 I Love That Crazy Little Thing (2016)
 I Love Trouble (1994)
 I Love Wolffy (2012)
 I Love Wolffy 2 (2013)
 I Love You: (1979, 1981, 1986, 1992, 2002, 2005 Croatian, 2005 Odia, 2007 Bengali & 2007 Mozambican)
 I Love You Again (1940)
 I Love You Baby (2001)
 I Love You to Death (1990)
 I Love You Phillip Morris (2010)
 I Love You Too (2002)
 I Love You, Alice B. Toklas (1968)
 I Love You, Beth Cooper (2009)
 I Love You, I Love You Not (1996)
 I Love You, Man (2009)
 I Love Your Work (2003)
 I Married an Angel (1942)
 I Married a Communist (1949)
 I Married a Monster from Outer Space (1958)
 I Married a Strange Person! (1997)
 I Married a Witch (1942)
 I Me Wed (2007)
 I Melt with You (2011)
 I Met Him in Paris (1937)
 I Missed Flight 93 (2006)
 I Never Promised You a Rose Garden (1977)
 I Never Sang for My Father (1970)
 I Now Pronounce You Chuck & Larry (2007)
 I Proud to Be an Indian (2004)
 I Remember Mama (1948)
 I Remember You: (2015 & 2017)
 I Remember You Now... (2005)
 I Saw the Devil (2010)
 I Saw Mommy Kissing Santa Claus (2001)
 I Saw What You Did: (1965 & 1988 TV)
 I See You: (2006 & 2019)
 I Sell the Dead (2009)
 I Served the King of England (2006)
 I Shot Andy Warhol (1996)
 I Shot Jesse James (1949)
 I Spit on Your Grave: (1978 & 2010)
 I Spit on Your Grave 2 (2013)
 I Spit on Your Grave: Deja Vu (2019)
 I Spy (2002)
 I Stand Alone (1998)
 I Start Counting (1970)
 I Step Through Moscow (1963)
 I Still Hide To Smoke (2017)
 I Still Know What You Did Last Summer (1998)
 I Stole a Million (1939)
 I Think I Do (1998)
 I Think I Love My Wife (2007)
 I Think We're Alone Now (2018)
 I Trapped the Devil (2019)
 I Vampiri (1957)
 I Vitelloni (1953)
 I Wake Up Screaming (1942)
 I Walk Alone (1948)
 I Walked with a Zombie (1943)
 I Wanna Hold Your Hand (1978)
 I Want Candy (2007)
 I Want a Dog (2003)
 I Want to Live! (1958)
 I Want Someone to Eat Cheese With (2006)
 I Want What I Want (1972)
 I Was Born, But... (1932)
 I Was a Communist for the FBI (1951)
 I Was Here (2008)
 I Was at Home, But (2019)
 I Was a Male War Bride (1949)
 I Was Monty's Double (1958)
 I Was a Shoplifter (1950)
 I Was a Simple Man (2021)
 I Was a Teenage Frankenstein (1957)
 I Was a Teenage Werewolf (1957)
 I Was a Teenage Zombie (1987)
 I Will Survive (1993)
 I Wish I Had a Wife (2001)
 I Wish I Knew (2010)
 I Woke Up Early the Day I Died (1999)
 I, Anna (2012)
 I, Claudius (1937)
 I, Daniel Blake (2016)
 I, Frankenstein (2014)
 I, the Jury: (1953 & 1982)
 I, Madman (1989)
 I, Me Aur Main (2013)
 I, Monster (1971)
 I, Robot (2004)
 I, Tonya (2017)
 I, a Woman (1965)
 I, Zombie: A Chronicle of Pain (1998)
 I'd Climb the Highest Mountain (1951)
 I'll Always Know What You Did Last Summer (2006)
 I'll Cry Tomorrow (1955)
 I'll Do Anything (1994)
 I'll Be Home for Christmas (1998)
 I'll Never Forget What's 'Isname (1967)
 I'll Never Heil Again (1941)
 I'll Never Lose You (2015)
 I'll Remember April: (1945 & 1999)
 I'll See You in My Dreams: (1951 & 2003)
 I'll Be Seeing You (1944)
 I'll Sleep When I'm Dead (2003)
 I'm All Right Jack (1959)
 I'm Bout It (1997)
 I'm a Cyborg, But That's OK (2006)
 I'm Dangerous Tonight (1990 TV)
 I'm Gonna Git You Sucka (1988)
 I'm No Angel (1933)
 I'm Not Rappaport (1996)
 I'm Not Scared (2003)
 I'm Not There. (2007)
 I'm So Excited (2013)
 I'm Still Here (2010)
 I'm Thinking of Ending Things (2020)
 I've Heard the Mermaids Singing (1987)
 I've Loved You So Long (2008)
 I.D. (1995)
 I.Q. (1994)

Ic

 Iacob (1988)
 Iago (2009)
 "Iamhere" (2019)
 Ibiza (2018)
 Iblis (2018)
 Icaria (TBD)
 Icarus: (2010 & 2017)
 Ice: (1970, 1998, 2003 & 2018)
 Ice Age (1975)
 Ice Age series:
 Ice Age (2002)
 Ice Age: The Meltdown (2006)
 Ice Age: Dawn of the Dinosaurs (2009)
 Ice Age: Continental Drift (2012)
 Ice Age: Collision Course (2016)
 The Ice Age Adventures of Buck Wild (2022)
 Ice Angel (2000 TV)
 Ice Blues (2008 TV)
 Ice Breaker (2004)
 Ice Castles: (1978 & 2010)
 Ice Cold in Alex (1958)
 Ice Cream: (1986, 1993, 2014, 2015 & 2016)
 Ice Cream in the Cupboard (2019)
 Ice Cream Man (1995)
 Ice Cream and the Sound of Raindrops (2017)
 Ice Cream, I Scream (2006)
 The Ice Flood (1926)
 The Ice Follies of 1939 (1939)
 The Ice Forest (2014)
 Ice Guardians (2016)
 The Ice Harvest (2005)
 The Ice House: (1969 & 1978 TV)
 Ice Kacang Puppy Love (2010)
 Ice Kings (2006)
 Ice Men (2005)
 Ice Mother (2017)
 Ice Palace (1960)
 Ice People (1987)
 Ice People (2008)
 The Ice Pirates (1984)
 Ice Planet (2001)
 Ice Poison (2014)
 Ice Princess (2005)
 Ice Quake (2010 TV)
 Ice Queen (2005)
 Ice Rain (2004)
 The Ice Rink (1998)
 The Ice Road (2021)
 Ice Soldiers (2013)
 Ice Spiders (2007 TV)
 Ice Station Zebra (1968)
 The Ice Storm (1997)
 Ice Twisters (2009 TV)
 Ice-Capades (1941)
 Icebound (1924)
 Icebreaker (2000)
 The Icebreaker (2016)
 Iced (1988)
 The Iced Bullet (1917)
 Iceland (1942)
 The Icelandic Dream (2000)
 Iceman: (1984, 2014 & 2017)
 The Iceman (2012)
 The Iceman Cometh: (1973, 1989 & 2014)
 The Iceman Ducketh (1964)
 Ichchhemotir Gappo (2015)
 Ichi (2008)
 Ichi the Killer (2001)
 Ichijo's Wet Lust (1972)
 The Icicle Thief (1989)
 Ico, el caballito valiente (1987)
 Icon (2005 TV)
 Icy Breasts (1974)

Id

 Ida (2013)
 Idaho: (1925 & 1943)
 Idaho Transfer (1973)
 Idam Jagath (2018)
 Idam Porul Yaeval (TBD)
 Idanazhiyil Oru Kaalocha (1987)
 Idaya Kovil (1985)
 Iddarammayilatho (2013)
 Iddari Lokam Okate (2019)
 Iddaru Asadhyule (1979)
 Iddaru Attala Muddula Alludu (2006)
 Iddaru Iddare (1990)
 Iddaru Mitrulu: (1961 & 1999)
 Iddaru Pellala Muddula Police (1991)
 Iddaru Pellalu (1954)
 Ide Mahasudina (1965)
 Idea Girl (1946)
 Ideachi Kalpana (2010)
 Ideal Home (2018)
 An Ideal Husband: (1935, 1947, 1980 & 1999 & 2000)
 Idealist (1976)
 Idem Pellam Baboi (1990)
 Identification of a Woman (1982)
 Identifying Features (2020)
 Identikit (1974)
 Identity: (1987 & 2003)
 Identity Card: (2010 & 2014)
 Identity Crisis (1989)
 Identity Pieces (1998)
 Identity Thief (2013)
 Identity Theft (2004 TV)
 Identity Unknown: (1945 & 1960)
 The Ides of March: (1961 TV & 2011)
 Idharkuthane Aasaipattai Balakumara (2013)
 Idhaya Kamalam (1965)
 Idhaya Malar (1976)
 Idhaya Nayagan (1993)
 Idhaya Thamarai (1990)
 Idiocracy (2006)
 Idiot: (1992, 2002, 2012 & 2022)
 The Idiot: (1946, 1951, 1958 & 2011)
 Idiot Box (1996)
 The Idiot Returns (1999)
 Idiot's Delight (1939)
 The Idiots (1998)
 The Idle Class (1921)
 Idle Hands (1999)
 Idlewild (2006)
 Idol (2019)
 The Idol of Bonanza Camp (1913)
 Idol of the Crowds (1937)
 Idol on Parade (1959)
 Idol of Paris (1948)
 The Idol of Paris (1914)
 Idolators (1917)
 The Idolmaster Movie: Beyond the Brilliant Future! (2014)
 Idols (1943)
 Idols of Clay (1920)
 Idols of the Radio (1934)
 Idu Saadhya (1989)
 Idukki Gold (2013)
 Idyla ze staré Prahy (1918)
 Idyll in Budapest (1941)
 Idylle au Caire (1933)

If

 If (2024)
 If.... (1968)
 If All the Guys in the World (1956)
 If Anything Happens I Love You (2020)
 If Beale Street Could Talk (2018)
 If Cats Disappeared From the World (2016)
 If... Dog... Rabbit... (1999)
 If Ever I See You Again (1978)
 If Footmen Tire You, What Will Horses Do? (1971)
 If Four Walls Told (1923)
 If God Is Willing and da Creek Don't Rise (2010)
 If He Hollers, Let Him Go! (1968)
 If I Am President (2018)
 If I Didn't Care (2007)
 If I Had Known I Was a Genius (2007)
 If I Had a Million (1932)
 If I Had My Way (1940)
 If I Had You (2006 TV)
 If I Knew What You Said (2009)
 If I Marry Again (1925)
 If I Should Fall (2010)
 If I Stay (2014)
 If I Want to Whistle, I Whistle (2010)
 If I Was She (2004 TV)
 If I Were a Congressman (1952)
 If I Were Free (1933)
 If I Were Just Anyone (1950)
 If I Were King: (1920 & 1938)
 If I Were Queen (1922)
 If I Were for Real (1981)
 If I Were Rich (1936)
 If I Were a Rich Man (2002)
 If I Were Single (1927)
 If I Were a Spy (1967)
 If I Were You: (2006, 2012 Canadian & 2012 Chinese)
 If I'm Lucky (1946)
 If It Don't Fit, Use a Bigger Hammer (2002)
 If It Were Love (2020)
 If It's Tuesday, This Must Be Belgium: (1969 & 1987 TV)
 If Looks Could Kill (1991)
 If Lucy Fell (1996)
 If Marriage Fails (1925)
 If My Country Should Call (1916)
 If Not Us, Who? (2011)
 If Only (2004)
 If Only Everyone (2012)
 If Only It Weren't Love (1925)
 If Paris Were Told to Us (1956)
 If Someone Had Known (1995)
 If the Sun Rises in the West (1998)
 If There Be Thorns (2015) (TV)
 If There Is a Reason to Study (2016)
 If These Walls Could Talk (1996) (TV)
 If These Walls Could Talk 2 (2000) (TV)
 If They Tell You I Fell (1989)
 If Thou Wert Blind (1917)
 If Tomorrow Comes (1971 TV)
 If Tomorrow Never Comes (2016)
 If War Comes Tomorrow (1938)
 If We All Were Angels: (1936 & 1956)
 If We Only Knew (1913)
 If You Are the One (2008)
 If You Meet Sartana Pray for Your Death (1968)

Ig-Il

 Igby Goes Down (2002)
 Igloo: (1932 & 2019)
 Ignition (2001)
 Ignorance Is Bliss (2017)
 Igor (2008)
 Igor and the Lunatics (1985)
 Igualita a mí (2010)
 Iguana (1988)
 Ihmiset suviyössä (1948)
 Ihre Hoheit die Tänzerin (1922)
 Ijaazat (1987)
 Ik Doli (1982)
 Ik ga naar Tahiti (1992)
 Ik Jind Ik Jaan (2006)
 Ik Kudi Punjab Di (2010)
 Ik Madari (1973)
 Ik Omhels Je Met 1000 Armen (2006)
 Ikarie XB-1 (1963)
 Ikarus, the Flying Man (1918)
 Ikaw Ay Akin (1978)
 Ikaw Pa Lang ang Minahal (1992)
 Ikaw ang Pag-ibig (2011)
 Ike: Countdown to D-Day (2004)
 Ikigami (2008)
 Ikiru (1952)
 Ikiteiru Koheiji (1957)
 Ikke Pe Ikka (1994)
 Ilakkanam (2006)
 Ilamai (1985)
 Ilamai Kaalangal (1983)
 Ilamai Kolam (1980)
 Ilamai Oonjal (2016)
 Ilamai Oonjal Aadukirathu (1978)
 Ilami (2016)
 Ilampuyal (2009)
 Ilanjippookkal (1986)
 Ilavarasan (1992)
 Ilavelpu (1956)
 Ilaya Thalaimurai (1977)
 Ilayum Mullum (1994)
 Ill Gotten Gains (1997)
 Ill Manors (2012)
 Ill Met by Moonlight (1957)
 Ill Noise (2017)
 Ill Wind (2007)
 Illale Devata (1985)
 Illalu (1940)
 Illalu Priyuralu (1984)
 Illam (1988)
 Illang: The Wolf Brigade (2018)
 Illara Jothi (1954)
 Illarame Nallaram (1958)
 Illarikam (1959)
 Illuminata (1999)
 Illusion Travels by Streetcar (1954)
 The Illusionist: (2006 & 2010)
 Illusive Tracks (2003)
 The Illustrated Man (1969)
 Illustrious Corpses (1976)
 Ilsa series:
 Ilsa, Harem Keeper of the Oil Sheiks (1976)
 Ilsa, She Wolf of the SS (1975)
 Ilsa, the Tigress of Siberia (1977)
 Ilsa, the Wicked Warden (1977)
 Ilya Muromets (1956)

Im

 Im toten Winkel - Hitlers Sekretärin (2002)
 Imaandaar (1987)
 The Image Book (2018)
 Image of Death (1978 TV)
 Images (1972)
 Images in a Convent (1979)
 Images of Liberation (1982)
 Imagi Ningthem (1981)
 Imaginaerum (2012)
 The Imaginarium of Doctor Parnassus (2009)
 Imaginary Crimes (1994)
 Imaginary Friend (2012 TV)
 Imaginary Heroes (2004)
 Imaginary Larry (2009)
 Imaginary Playmate (2006)
 The Imaginary Voyage (1926)
 Imaginary Witness (2004)
 Imagination (2007)
 Imagine: (1972 & 2012)
 Imagine Me & You (2005)
 Imagine the Sound (1981)
 Imagine That (2009)
 Imagine You and Me (2016)
 Imagining America (1989)
 Imagining Argentina (2003)
 Imagining Indians (1992)
 Imaginum (2005)
 Imago Mortis (2009)
 Imaikkaa Nodigal (2018)
 Imani (2010)
 Imar the Servitor (1914)
 Imayam (1979)
 Imbabazi: The Pardon (2013)
 Imelda (2003)
 Imfura (2017)
 Imitation (2007)
 Imitation of Christ (1967)
 The Imitation Game (2014)
 Imitation General (1958)
 Imitation of Life: (1934 & 1959)
 Immaan Dharam (1977)
 Immacolata and Concetta: The Other Jealousy (1980)
 Immaculate (1950)
 Immaculate Conception (1992)
 Immaculate Memories: The Uncluttered Worlds of Christopher Pratt (2018)
 The Immaculate Room (2022)
 Immadi Pulikeshi (1967)
 Immanuel (2013)
 ImMature (2019)
 Immediate Call (1939)
 Immediate Delivery (1963)
 Immediate Family (1989)
 Immensee (1943)
 Immer die Radfahrer (1958)
 The Immigrant: (1915, 1917 & 2013)
 Immigrants: (1948 & 2008)
 Immigration Tango (2010)
 Imminent Threat (2015)
 Immoral Affairs (1997)
 Immoral Tales (1973)
 Immoral Women (1979)
 Immorality (1928)
 Immortal: (2004 & 2015)
 Immortal Beloved: (1951 & 1994)
 Immortal Combat (1994)
 Immortal Gentleman (1935)
 Immortal Light (1951)
 Immortal Love (1961)
 Immortal Melodies (1952)
 Immortal Sergeant (1943)
 Immortal Song (1952)
 Immortal Waltz (1939)
 Immortally Yours (2009)
 Immortals (2011)
 Impact: (1949 & 1963)
 Impasse (1969)
 Impasse de la vignette (1990)
 Impeccable Henri (1948)
 Imperative (1982)
 Imperfect (2012)
 Imperfect Journey (1994)
 The Imperfect Lady (1947)
 Imperial Blue (2019)
 Imperial Navy (1981)
 Imperial Venus (1962)
 Imperial Violets: (1924, 1932 & 1952)
 Imperium (2016)
 Imperium series:
 Imperium: Augustus (2003 TV)
 Imperium: Nero (2004 TV)
 Imperium: Saint Peter (2005 TV)
 Imperium: Pompeii (2007 TV)
 Impetuous Love in Action (2014)
 Impolite (1992)
 The Importance of Being Earnest: (1952 & 2002)
 Impossible (2015)
 The Impossible: (1965 & 2012)
 Impossible Object (1973)
 The Impossible Voyage (1904)
 The Imposter: (2008 & 2012)
 Impostor: (1921 & 2001)
 The Impostor: (1927 & 1944)
 The Impostors (1998)
 Impromptu: (1932 & 1991)
 Improper Conduct (1984)
 Imsai Arasan 23rd Pulikecei (2006)
 Imthihaan (1993)
 Imtihaan: (1949 & 1994)
 Imtihan (1974)

In

 In the Aisles (2018)
 In the Aisles of the Wild (1912)
 In America (2002)
 In the Army Now (1994)
 In the Basement (2014)
 In the Bedroom (2001)
 In a Better World (2010)
 The In Between (2022)
 In the Bleak Midwinter (1995)
 In the Blood: (1923, 1988, 2014 & 2016)
 In Bruges (2008)
 In China They Eat Dogs (1999)
 In Cold Blood (1967)
 In the Company of Men (1997)
 In Country (1989)
 In the Courtyard (2014)
 The In Crowd: (1988 & 2000)
 In Custody (1993)
 In the Cut (2003)
 In Darkness: (2009 & 2011)
 In Dreams (1999)
 In Dubious Battle (2016)
 In the Earth (2021)
 In the Electric Mist (2009)
 In Enemy Hands (2004)
 In Fear (2013)
 In the Folds of the Flesh (1970)
 In For a Murder (2021)
 In the French Style (1963)
 In Front of Your Face (2021)
 In a Glass Cage (1986)
 In the Gloaming (1997)
 In God We Tru$t (1980)
 In God We Trust (2013)
 In God's Hands (1998)
 In Good Company: (2000 & 2004)
 In the Good Old Summertime (1949)
 In Harm's Way (1965)
 In the Heat of the Night (1967)
 In the Heart of the Sea (2015)
 In the Heat of the Sun (1994)
 In the Heights (2021)
 In Hell (2003)
 In Her Footsteps (2017)
 In Her Shoes (2005)
 In July (2000)
 In the Land of Blood and Honey (2012)
 In the Land of the Cactus (1913)
 In the Land of the Deaf (1992)
 In the Land of the Head Hunters (1914)
 In the Land of Women (2007)
 In Like Flint (1967)
 In Like Flynn (2018)
 In the Line of Fire (1993)
 In a Lonely Place (1950)
 In the Loop (2009)
 In Love and War (1996)
 In Love We Trust (2008)
 In the Mix (2005)
 In the Mood for Love (2000)
 In the Mouth of Madness (1995)
 In My Country (2004)
 In My Father's Den (2004)
 In Nacht und Eis (1912)
 In the Name of the Father: (1993 & 2006)
 In the Name of the King: (1924 & 2007)
 In the Name of the King 2: Two Worlds (2011)
 In the Name of the King 3: The Last Mission (2014)
 In Name Only (1939)
 In the Name of the Son: (2007 & 2012)
 In The Navy (1941)
 In the Nick of Time: (1911 & 1991 TV)
 In Old Arizona (1928)
 In Old Chicago (1938)
 In Olden Days (1952)
 In & Out (1997)
 In the Park (1914)
 In Praise of Love (2001)
 In the Presence of a Clown (1997) (TV)
 In Public (2001)
 In the Radiant City (2016)
 In the Realm of the Senses (1976)
 In Search Of (2008)
 In Search of the Castaways (1962)
 In Search of Darkness (2019)
 In Search of Dr. Seuss (1994) (TV)
 In Search of Fellini (2017)
 In Search of Greatness (2018)
 In Search of Happiness (2005)
 In Search of a Midnight Kiss (2007)
 In Search of Noah's Ark (1976)
 In Search of Santa (2004)
 In Search of Tomorrow (2022)
 In the Shadow of the Moon (2007)
 In a Shallow Grave (1988)
 In Their Skin (2012)
 In Society (1944)
 In This Our Life (1942)
 In This World (2002)
 In the Tall Grass (2019)
 In Time (2011)
 In the Time of the Butterflies (2001)
 In Transit (2008)
 In the Valley of Elah (2007)
 In a Valley of Violence (2016)
 In Vanda's Room (2000)
 In the Wake of the Bounty (1933)
 In Which We Serve (1942)
 In the Winter Dark (1998)
 In a Year of 13 Moons (1978)
 The In-Laws: (1979 & 2003)

Ina-Inl

 Ina (1982)
 Ina Ka ng Anak Mo (1979)
 Inaam Dus Hazaar (1987)
 Inadequate People (2010)
 Inadequate People 2 (2020)
 Inadmissible Evidence (1968)
 Inaindha Kaigal (1990)
 Inappropriate Comedy (2013)
 Inauguration of the Pleasure Dome (1954)
 Inazuma Eleven GO vs. Danbōru Senki W (2012)
 Inazuma Eleven GO: Kyūkyoku no Kizuna Gurifon (2011)
 Inazuma Eleven: Saikyō Gundan Ōga Shūrai (2010)
 Inba (2008)
 Inba Twinkle Lilly (2018)
 Inbetween Worlds (2014)
 The Inbetweeners Movie (2011)
 Inbred (2011)
 Incantation (2022)
 Incarnate (2016)
 Incendiary (2008)
 Incendiary: The Willingham Case (2011)
 Incendiary Blonde (1945)
 Incendies (2011)
 Incense (2003)
 Inception (2010)
 Incessant Visions (2011)
 Incest (1929)
 Inch'Allah (2012)
 Inchi Inchi Prem (2013)
 Inchon (1982)
 Incident (1948)
 The Incident: (1967, 1978, 1990 & 2014)
 Incident of the 7th Bamboo Flute (1936)
 Incident at Clovelly Cottage (1895)
 Incident on a Dark Street (1973 TV)
 Incident Light (2015)
 Incident at Loch Ness (2004)
 Incident at Oglala (1992)
 Incident at Raven's Gate (1988)
 Incident in San Francisco (1971 TV)
 Incident in a Small Town (1994 TV)
 Incitement (2019)
 Incomplete Eclipse (1982)
 Inconceivable (2017)
 An Inconvenient Sequel: Truth to Power (2017)
 An Inconvenient Truth (2006)
 The Incredible Burt Wonderstone (2013)
 The Incredible Hulk (2008)
 The Incredible Melting Man (1977)
 The Incredible Mr. Limpet (1964)
 The Incredible Professor Zovek (1972)
 The Incredible Shrinking Man (1957)
 The Incredible Shrinking Woman (1981)
 The Incredibles series:
 The Incredibles (2004)
 Incredibles 2 (2018)
 The Incredibly Strange Creatures Who Stopped Living and Became Mixed-Up Zombies (1964)
 The Incredibly True Adventure of Two Girls in Love (1995)
 Incubus: (1966 & 2006)
 The Incubus (1982)
 Indecent Proposal (1993)
 Independence Day (1983)
 Independence Day (1996)
 Independence Day: Resurgence (2016)
 The Independent: (2000, 2007 & 2022)
 Indestructible Man (1956)
 India Song (1975)
 India Speaks (1933)
 Indian: (1996 & 2001)
 Indian 2 (TBD)
 The Indian in the Cupboard (1995)
 The Indian Runner (1991)
 Indian Summer: (1970, 1973, 1993 & 1996)
 The Indian Tomb: (1921, 1938 & 1959)
 Indiana Jones series:
 Raiders of the Lost Ark (1981)
 Indiana Jones and the Temple of Doom (1984)
 Indiana Jones and the Last Crusade (1989)
 Indiana Jones and the Kingdom of the Crystal Skull (2008)
 Indiana Jones and the Dial of Destiny (2023)
 Indigènes (2006)
 Indigenous (2014)
 Indiscreet: (1931 & 1958)
 Indiscretion of an American Wife (1953)
 Indochine (1992)
 Indra: (2002 & 2008)
 The Inerasable (2015)
 Infamous (2006 & 2020)
 Infection: (2003, 2004 & 2019)
 Infernal Affairs series:
 Infernal Affairs (2002)
 Infernal Affairs II (2003)
 Infernal Affairs III (2003)
 The Infernal Cake Walk (1903)
 The Infernal Cauldron (1903)
 Infernal Machine (1933)
 Inferno: (1953, 1980, & 2016)
 L'Inferno (1911)
 Infestation (2009)
 Infidel (2020)
 Infidelity: (1917 & 1987 TV)
 Infinite (2021)
 Infinity (1996)
 Infinity Pool (2023)
 The Informant! (2009)
 The Informer: (1912, 1929, 1935 & 2019)
 The Informers: (1963 & 2008)
 Ingagi (1930)
 The Inglorious Bastards (1978)
 Inglourious Basterds (2009)
 Ingmar Bergman Makes a Movie (1962)
 Ingrid Goes West (2017)
 Inherent Vice (2014)
 Inherit the Wind: (1960, 1988 TV & 1999 TV)
 The Inheritance (2020)
 The Inheritance or Fuckoffguysgoodday (1992)
 Initial D (2005)
 The Initiation (1984)
 Initiation Love (2015)
 The Initiation of Sarah: (1978 TV & 2006 TV)
 Initiation: Silent Night, Deadly Night 4 (1990)
Injustice (2021)
Ink (2009)
 Inkaar: (1943, 1977 & 2013)
 Inkheart (2009)
 The Inkwell (1994)
 Inland Empire (2006)

Inn-Inv

 Inn of the Damned (1975)
 Inn of Evil (1971)
 The Inn on the River (1962)
 Inn of the Sinful Daughters (1978)
 The Inn of the Sixth Happiness (1958)
 An Inn in Tokyo (1935)
 Inn for Trouble (1960)
 Inna de Yard: The Soul of Jamaica (2019)
 Innale (1990)
 Innale Innu (1977)
 Innalenkil Nale (1982)
 Innaleyude Baakki (1988)
 Innanu Aa Kalyanam (2011)
 Innathe Chintha Vishayam (2008)
 Innathe Program (1991)
 Inner City (1995)
 Inner Demons (2014)
 Inner Jellyfishes (2015)
 The Inner Life of Martin Frost (2007)
 Inner Sanctum: (1948 & 1991)
 Inner Workings (2016)
 Innerspace (1987)
 The Innkeepers (2011)
 Innocence: (1923, 2000, 2004, 2005, 2011, 2013 & 2020)
 Innocence of Muslims (2012)
 Innocent Blood (1992)
 Innocent Steps (2005)
 The Innocent: (1976, 1985, 1986, 1993, 1994 & 2022)
 The Innocents: (1961, 1963, 2016 & 2021)
 Les Innocents (1987)
 Inochi (2002)
 Insane (2016)
 Insanity (2015)
 Insatiable (1980)
 The Insect Woman (1963)
 Inseminoid (1981)
 Inside: (1996 TV, 2002, 2007, 2011, 2012, 2013 & 2016)
 Inside Daisy Clover (1965)
 Inside Deep Throat (2005)
 Inside the Girls (2014)
 Inside I'm Dancing (2004)
 Inside Job: (1946 & 2010)
 Inside Llewyn Davis (2013)
 Inside Man (2006)
 Inside Men (2015)
 Inside Monkey Zetterland (1992)
 Inside Nazi Germany (1938)
 Inside Out: (1975, 1986, 2011 & 2015)
 Inside/Out (1997)
 The Insider (1999)
 Insidious series:
 Insidious (2010)
 Insidious: Chapter 2 (2013)
 Insidious: Chapter 3 (2015)
 Insidious: The Last Key (2018)
 Insignificance (1985)
 Insomnia: (1997 & 2002)
 Insomnia Lover (2016)
 An Inspector Calls: (1954, 2015 British & 2015 Hong Kong)
 Inspector Clouseau (1968)
 Inspector Gadget (1999)
 Inspector Gadget 2 (2003)
 The Inspector General: (1933 & 1949)
 Inspiration: (1915, 1928, 1931 & 1949)
 Instant Family (2018)
 Instinct: (1930, 1999 & 2019)
 Insult (1932)
 The Insult (2017)
 Insyriated (2017)
 Intact (2001)
 Intentions of Murder (1964)
 Interceptor (2022)
 Interiors (1978)
 Intermezzo: (1936 & 1939)
 Intermission (2003)
 The Intern: (2000 & 2015)
 Intern Academy (2004)
 Internal Affairs (1990)
 The International: (2006 & 2009)
 International House (1933)
 International Khiladi (1999)
 International Sweethearts of Rhythm (1986)
 International Velvet (1978)
 The Internship (2013)
 The Interpreter (2005)
 Intersection (1994)
 Interstate 60 (2002)
 Interstella 5555: The 5tory of the 5ecret 5tar 5ystem (2003)
 Interstellar (2014)
 Interview: (1971, 1973, 2000, 2003 & 2007)
 The Interview: (1998 & 2014)
 Interview with the Vampire (1994)
 Interviewing Monsters and Bigfoot (2020)
 Intervista (1987)
 Intimacy: (1966 & 2001)
 Intimate Lighting (1965)
 Intimate Relations: (1937, 1953 & 1996)
 The Intimate Stranger: (1956 & unfinished)
 Intimate Strangers: (1977 TV, 2004 & 2018)
 Into the Abyss (2011)
 Into the Arms of Strangers: Stories of the Kindertransport (2000)
 Into the Blue: (1950 & 2005)
 Into the Blue 2: The Reef (2009)
 Into the Dark (2012)
 Into the Deep (2020)
 Into the Forest (2015)
 Into Great Silence (2005)
 Into the Grizzly Maze (2015)
 Into the Mirror (2003)
 Into the Night: (1928 & 1985)
 Into the Storm: (2009 & 2014)
 Into the Sun: (1992 & 2005)
 Into Temptation (2009)
 Into the West (1992)
 Into the White (2012)
 Into the Wild (2007)
 Into the Woods (2014)
 Intolerable Cruelty (2003)
 Intolerance (1916)
 The Intouchables (2011)
 Intriga en Lima (1965)
 Introduction (2021)
 The Intruder: (1933, 1939, 1944, 1953, 1956, 1962, 1975, 1986, 1999, 2004, 2005, 2010, 2017, 2019 & 2020)
 Intruders: (2011, 2013 & 2015)
 Intrusion (2021)
 El Intruso (1999)
 Inuyasha the Movie: The Castle Beyond the Looking Glass (2004)
 Invaders from Mars: (1953 & 1986)
 Invaders from Space (1964)
 Invader Zim: Enter the Florpus (2019)
 Invasion: (1966, 1997 TV, 2012, 2014, 2017 & 2020)
 The Invasion (2007)
 Invasion of Astro-Monster (1965)
 Invasion of the Bee Girls (1973)
 Invasion of the Body Snatchers: (1956 & 1978)
 Invasion of the Neptune Men (1961)
 Invasion U.S.A.: (1952 & 1985)
 Inventing the Abbotts (1997)
 The Invention of Lying (2009)
 The Inventor: (1981 & 2023)
 The Inventor Crazybrains and His Wonderful Airship (1905)
 Investigating Sex (2001)
 Investigation of a Citizen Above Suspicion (1970)
 Invictus (2009)
 Invincible: (2001, 2001 TV & 2006)
 The Invincible Iron Man (2007)
 The Invincible Masked Rider (1963)
 The Invincible Piglet (2015)
 The Invisible: (2002 & 2007)
 Invisible Agent (1942)
 Invisible Avenger (1958)
 The Invisible Avenger (1954)
 The Invisible Circus (2001)
 Invisible Ghost (1941)
 The Invisible Informer (1946)
 The Invisible Man: (1933 & 2020)
 The Invisible Man Returns (1940)
 The Invisible Maniac (1990)
 An Invisible Sign (2010)
 The Invisible War (2012)
 Invisible Waves (2006)
 Invisible Wings (2007)
 The Invisible Woman: (1940, 1969, 1983 TV & 2013)
 Invitation: (1952 & 2008)
 The Invitation: (1973, 2015 & 2022)
 Invitation to the Dance (1956)
 Invitation to a Gunfighter (1964)

Io 

 Io (2019)
 Io amo Andrea (2000)
 Io che amo solo te (2015)
 Io con te non ci sto più (1983)
 Io e il re (1995)
 Io e lui (1973)
 Io e mia sorella (1987)
 Io non protesto, io amo (1967)
 Io non spezzo... rompo (1971)
 Io piaccio (1955)
 Io sono il capataz (1950)
 Io sono Mia (2019)
 Io sono Tempesta (2018)
 Io sono Tony Scott (2012)
 Io ti amo (1968)
 Iodine (2009)
 Iodo (1977)
 Iona (2015)

Ip–Ir

 Ip Man series:
 Ip Man (2008)
 Ip Man 2 (2010)
 Ip Man 3 (2015)
 Ip Man 4: The Finale (2019)
 Ip Man: The Final Fight (2013)
 Ip Man: Kung Fu Master (2019)
 The IPCRESS File (1965)
 Iphigenia (1977)
 Ipolochagos Natassa (1970)
 Ippadai Vellum (2017)
 Ippadikku En Kadhal (2007)
 Ippadiyum Oru Penn (1975)
 Ippodromi all'alba (1950)
 Iqaluit (2016)
 Iqbal (2005)
 Ira (2018)
 Ira & Abby (2006)
 Ira Thedunna Manushyar (1981)
 Iracema: (1917 & 1949)
 Iracema: Uma Transa Amazônica (1974)
 Irada: (1991 & 2017)
 Irada Pakka (2010)
 Iraivan Kodutha Varam (1978)
 Irina Palm (2007)
 Iris (2001)
 The Irishman: (1978 & 2019)
 Irma la Douce (1963)
 Irma Vep (1997)
 Iron Eagle series:
 Iron Eagle (1986)
 Iron Eagle II (1988)
 Aces: Iron Eagle III (1992)
Iron Eagle on the Attack (1995)
 The Iron Giant (1999)
 The Iron Heel (1919)
 The Iron Heel of Oligarchy (1999)
 The Iron Lady (2012)
 Iron Man: (1931, 1951, 2008 & 2009)
 Iron Man 2 (2010)
 Iron Man 3 (2013)
 Iron Man & Captain America: Heroes United (2014)
 Iron Man & Hulk: Heroes United (2013)
 Iron Man: Rise of Technovore (2013)
 Iron Monkey: (1977 & 1993)
 The Iron Orchard (2018)
 Iron Sky (2012)
 Iron Sky: The Coming Race (2018)
 Iron Warrior (1987)
 Iron Will (1994)
 Ironclad (2011)
 Ironweed (1987)
 Irony of Fate (1975)
 Irrational Man (2015)
 Irreconcilable Differences (1984)
 The Irrefutable Truth about Demons (2000)
 Irréversible (2002)

Is

 Is Anybody There? (2008)
 Is Divorce a Failure? (1923)
 Is Everybody Happy? (1929)
 Is Everybody Happy? (1943)
 Is Genesis History? (2017)
 Is Harry on the Boat? (2001 TV)
 Is It Always Right to Be Right? (1970)
 Is It Clear, My Friend? (2000)
 Is It College Yet? (2002 TV)
 Is It Easy to Be Young? (1987)
 Is It Fall Yet? (2000 TV)
 Is It Just Me? (2010)
 Is It My Turn (2012)
 Is Life Worth Living? (1921)
 Is Love Everything? (1924)
 Is Matrimony a Failure? (1922)
 Is Money Everything? (1923)
 Is My Face Red? (1932)
 Is My Palm Read (1933)
 Is Paris Burning? (1966)
 Is Raat Ki Subah Nahin (1996)

Isa-Isu

 Isaac (2019)
 Isabella: (1988 & 2006)
 Isadora (1968)
 I-San Special (2002)
 Ishaqzaade (2012)
 Ishq (1997)
 Ishq Garaari (2013)
 Ishq Hai Tumse (2004)
 Ishq Vishk (2003)
 Ishqiya (2010)
 Ishtar (1987)
 Isi & Ossi (2020)
 Isi Ka Naam Duniya Hai (1962)
 Isi Ka Naam Zindagi (1992)
 Isi Life Mein...! (2010)
 Iska's Journey (2007)
 Iski Topi Uske Sarr (1998)
 Iskra (2017)
 Iskul Bukol 20 Years After: The Ungasis and Escaleras Adventure (2008) 
 Isla Blanca (2018)
 Islam: What the West Needs to Know (2006)
 The Island: (1980 & 2005)
 Island of the Blue Dolphins (1964)
 Island of Death (1976)
 The Island of Doctor Agor (1971)
 Island of Doomed Men (1940)
 The Island of Dr. Moreau: (1977 & 1996)
 Island of the Fishmen (1979)
 Island of Lost Men (1939)
 Island of Lost Souls: (1932 & 2007)
 Island in the Sky: (1938 & 1953)
 Island in the Sun (1957)
 Island of Terror (1966)
 The Island at the Top of the World (1974)
 Island Zero (2018)
 The Isle (2000)
 The Isle of the Dead (1945)
 Isle of Dogs (2018)
 Isle of Flowers (1989)
 Ism (2016)
 Ismael (2013)
 Ismael's Ghosts (2017)
 Ismail Yassine in the Navy (1957)
 Isn't Anyone Alive? (2012)
 Isn't It Delicious (2013)
 Isn't It Romantic (2019)
 Isn't It Romantic? (1948)
 Isn't It Shocking? (1973 TV)
 Isn't Life Wonderful (1924)
 Isn't Life Wonderful! (1953)
 Isn't She Great (2000)
 Isola (2000)
 Isolation (2005)
 Isolation (2009)
 Iso lo (1994)
 Isoroku (2011)
 Ispade Rajavum Idhaya Raniyum (2019)
 Ispiritista: Itay, May Moomoo (2005)
 Israel: A Right to Live (1967)
 Issues 101 (2002)
 Istanbul (1957)
 Istanbul Beneath My Wings (1996)
 Istoria mias zois (1965)
 Isusumbong Kita sa Tatay Ko... (1999)

It

 It: (1927, 1990 & 2017)
 It Always Rains on Sunday (1947)
 It Came from Beneath the Sea (1955)
 It Came from Hollywood (1982)
 It Came from Outer Space (1953)
 It Came from the Sky (1999) (TV)
 It Chapter Two (2019)
 It Comes at Night (2017)
 It Conquered the World (1956)
 It Could Happen to You (1994)
 It Couldn't Happen Here (1988)
 It Follows (2015)
 It Had to Be You (2000)
 It Happened on 5th Avenue (1947)
 It Happened in Brooklyn (1947)
 It Happened Here (1966)
 It Happened at the Inn (1943)
 It Happened at Lakewood Manor (1977) (TV)
 It Happened One Night (1934)
 It Happened at the Police Station: (1954 & 1963)
 It Happened Tomorrow (1944)
 It Happened at the World's Fair (1963)
 It Might Get Loud (2009)
 It Runs in the Family (2003)
 It Should Happen to You (1954)
 It Started with a Kiss (1959)
 It Started in Naples (1960)
 It Takes Two: (1982, 1988 & 1995)
 It Was a Wonderful Life (1993)
 It! The Terror from Beyond Space (1958)
 It's in the Air (1938)
 It's Alive: (1974 & 2009)
 It's All About Love (2003)
 It's All Gone Pete Tong (2005)
 It's All True (unreleased)
 It's All True: Based on an Unfinished Film by Orson Welles (1993)
 It's Always Fair Weather (1955)
 It's in the Bag: (1936 & 1944)
 It's in the Bag! (1945)
 It's Complicated (2009)
 It's a Disaster (2012)
 It's Entertainment (2014)
 It's a Gift (1934)
 It's Great to Be Alive (1933)
 It's a Great Feeling (1949)
 It’s Here (2019)
 It's Kind of a Funny Story (2011)
 It's a Long Road (1998)
 It's a Mad, Mad, Mad, Mad World (1963)
 It's My Party (1996)
 It's Not Just You, Murray! (1964)
 It's Only Money (1962)
 It's the Rage (2000)
 It's a Very Merry Muppet Christmas Movie (2002)
 It's In the Water (1997)
 It's a Wonderful Afterlife (2010)
 It's a Wonderful Life (1946)
 It's a Wonderful World: (1939 & 1956)

Ita-Itt

 The Italian: (1915 & 2005)
 An Italian in America (1967)
 The Italian Barber (1911)
 Italian for Beginners (2000)
 The Italian Brigands (1962)
 The Italian Connection (1972)
 The Italian Job: (1969 & 2003)
 The Italian Key (2011)
 An Italian Name (2015)
 Italian Race (2016)
 An Italian Romance (2004)
 The Italian Straw Hat (1928)
 Italianamerican (1974)
 Italians (2009)
 The Italians They Are Crazy (1958)
 Italiencele (2004)
 Italo (2014)
 Italy in a Day (2014)
 Italy Has Awakened (1927)
 An Itch in Time (1943)
 Item 47 (2012)
 Item One (1956)
 Itha Innu Muthal (1984)
 Itha Ivide Vare (1977)
 Itha Oru Dhikkari (1981)
 Itha Oru Snehagatha (1997)
 Itha Oru Theeram (1979)
 Itha Samayamayi (1987)
 Ithaa Oru Manushyan (1978)
 Ithaanente Vazhi (1978)
 Ithaca (2015)
 Ithalukalkappuram (2017)
 Ithaya Geetham (1950)
 Ithihasa (2014)
 Ithile Iniyum Varu (1986)
 Ithile Vannavar (1980)
 Ithinumappuram (2015)
 Ithiri Poove Chuvannapoove (1984)
 Ithramathram (2012)
 Ithrayum Kaalam (1987)
 Ithu Engal Neethi (1988)
 Ithu Manushyano (1973)
 Ithu Nalla Thamasha (1985)
 Ithu Namma Veedu (2017)
 Ithu Nammude Katha (2011)
 Ithu Njangalude Katha (1982)
 Ithu Oru Thudakkom Mathram (1986)
 Ithu Pathiramanal (2013)
 Ithu Thaanda Police (2016)
 Ithubaaru (1987)
 Ithum Oru Jeevitham (1982)
 Iti Mrinalini (2011)
 Iti Srikanta (2004)
 Itihaas: (1987 & 1997)
 Itihas (2002)
 Itinerary of a Spoiled Child (1988)
 Itlu Sravani Subramanyam (2001)
 Ito: A Diary of an Urban Priest (2010)
 Itsuka dokusho suruhi (2005)
 Itsuka no Kimi e (2007)
 Itsy Bitsy Spider (1992)
 Itt a szabadság! (1991)
 Ittafaq: (1969, 2001 & 2017)
 Itty Bitty Titty Committee (2007)
 Ittymaani: Made in China (2019)

Iv-Iz

 Ival Eevazhi Ithu Vare (1980)
 Ival Oru Naadody (1979)
 Ivan (1932, 2002 & 2017)
 Ivan and Alexandra (1952)
 Ivan Brovkin on the State Farm (1959)
 Ivan & Ivana (2011)
 Ivan and Marya (1974)
 Ivan, Son of the White Devil (1953)
 Ivan the Terrible (1917)
 Ivan the Terrible, Part I (1944)
 Ivan the Terrible, Part II (1959)
 Ivan Tsarevich and the Gray Wolf (2011)
 Ivan Tsarevich and the Gray Wolf 2 (2013)
 Ivan Tsarevich and the Gray Wolf 3 (2016)
 Ivan Vasilievich: Back to the Future (1973)
 Ivan's Childhood (1962)
 Ivanhoe: (1913 American, 1913 British, 1952 & 1982 TV)
 Ivanhoe, the Norman Swordsman (1971)
 Ivanna (1959)
 Ivanov (2010)
 Ivans Xtc (2000)
 Ivanuku Thannila Gandam (2015)
 Ivar: (1980 & 2003)
 Ivargal Varungala Thoongal (1987)
 IXE-13 (1971)
 Iyer the Great (1990)
 Iyobinte Pusthakam (2014)
 IZO (2004)
 Izu no odoriko (1954)
 Izu no Odoriko (1974)
 Izzat: (1937, 1968, 1991 & 2005)
 Izzie's Way Home (2016)
 Izzy Gets the F*ck Across Town (2017)
 Izzy and Moe (1985)

Previous:  List of films: H    Next:  List of films: J–K

See also
 Lists of films
 Lists of actors
 List of film and television directors
 List of documentary films
 List of film production companies

-